WJRB (95.1 FM) is a radio station broadcasting a News/Talk format. Licensed to Young Harris, Georgia, United States, the station is currently owned by Jeffrey Batten's WJRB Radio, LLC.

Originally licensed as WACF, the station's call sign was changed to WJRB on December 3, 2012.

References

External links
WJRB Online

JRB
Radio stations established in 1985
1985 establishments in Georgia (U.S. state)